Miguel Gómez Damas (5 June 1785 – 11 June 1849) was a Spanish Carlist general of the First Carlist War.

Born at Torredonjimeno, in the province of Jaén, he served under the Carlist general Zumalacárregui and in 1836 undertook an unsuccessful military expedition against Liberal forces in various locations, including Asturias, Galicia, Extremadura, Andalusia, and La Mancha, but suffered defeats. He lost the battles of Villarrobledo and Majaceite.

He died in Bordeaux, France.

External links 
 Miguel Gómez Damas     

1785 births
1849 deaths
People from Torredonjimeno
Carlism
Spanish generals
Military personnel of the First Carlist War